The Harry W. Gray House is a historic home located in Arlington, Virginia.  It was built in 1881, and is two-story, three bay, "L"-shaped brick free-standing rowhouse dwelling in the Italianate style.  It has a standing seam metal shed roof and full-width one-story front porch.  It was built by Harry W. Gray (c.1851-1913), a former slave on General Robert E. Lee's Arlington House estate and the son of Selina Gray. It is a rare example of the brick rowhouse in Arlington County.

It was listed on the National Register of Historic Places in 2004.

References

External links
 Harry W. Gray House, 1005 South Quinn Street, Arlington, Arlington County, VA at the Historic American Buildings Survey (HABS)

Houses on the National Register of Historic Places in Virginia
Italianate architecture in Virginia
Houses completed in 1881
Houses in Arlington County, Virginia
National Register of Historic Places in Arlington County, Virginia
Historic American Buildings Survey in Virginia
1881 establishments in Virginia